Durg Gramin Vidhan Sabha constituency is one of the 90 Vidhan Sabha (Legislative Assembly) constituencies of Chhattisgarh state in central India.

It is part of Durg district.

Members of Legislative Assembly

Election results

2018

See also
 Durg district

References

Assembly constituencies of Chhattisgarh
Durg district